"Motivation" is a song by Canadian rock band Sum 41. It was released on January 5, 2002, as the third single from the album All Killer No Filler. Greig Nori appears on backing vocals.

Content
The song is about being nihilistic, apathetic, demotivated, and being too lazy to look for motivation to do anything.

Music video
The music video is of the band playing in Steve Jocz' attic located in Ajax Ontario. The room is piled with garbage and other various items.

Track listing
Single version
 "Motivation"
 "Crazy Amanda Bunkface"
 "Pain for Pleasure"
 "Machine Gun" (Live)
 "All She's Got" (Live)
 "Crazy Amanda Bunkface" (Live)
 "What We're All About" (Live)
 "Fat Lip" (Video)
 "In Too Deep" (Video)

EP version
 Motivation
 All She's Got (Live)
 Crazy Amanda Bunkface (Live)
 What We're All About (Live with Tommy Lee)

Charts

References

External links
 

2002 singles
Sum 41 songs
Songs written by Greig Nori
Songs written by Deryck Whibley
2002 songs